Slough Cricket Club is a cricket club based in Berkshire, in southern England. Slough Cricket Club has been at the forefront of cricket in the Thames Valley since it moved to Chalvey Road in 1899. It joined the Thames Valley League on its inception in 1972 and has remained in the top division ever since. Their first team play in Division Two of the Home Counties Premier Cricket League, with the 2nd, 3rd, 4th, 5th and 6th elevens playing in divisions 1,3,5,7 and 9 respectively in the Thames Valley Cricket League, a Sunday eleven team who participate in the South East Shires Cricket League, and a Junior Section, who play in the Berkshire Youth Cricket League.

Club history 
The club was founded in 1849.The club was initially based in Chalvey Road East since its formation but moved a mile to its present location Upton Court Park ground from the 2000 season.

Slough Cricket Club has produced many fine players over the years, one of which is Ian Gould. Ian played for Middlesex and captained Sussex after learning his trade at Slough and went on to represent England in the one-day game. He briefly took on the role of chairman following the retirement of Eddie Thompson in 2000. Eddie stood down after 13 years in the job and was the man responsible for overseeing the construction of the new ground. The current chairman, Tony Ellis, has returned to the role having served previously for a number of years and brings with him some much-needed discipline and direction following the departure of Ian Gould at the end of the 2001 season.

Club Honours

Teams
Slough Cricket Club has 7 senior and 23 juniors teams (U9/U11/U13/U15/U17/U19/Girl's U11/Girls U13).

Notable members
 Ian Gould - England international and ICC international umpire
 Chris Lewis - England international
 Toby Radford - West Indies batting coach
 Mark Gillespie - New Zealand international
 Chris Pringle - New Zealand international
 Saif Zaib - Northamptonshire County Cricket Club player
 Kamran Younis - Pakistan International

All Stars Cricket & Dynamos Cricket

Slough Cricket club is an approved center for All Stars Cricket. It is an initiative from the England and Wales Cricket Board aimed at providing children aged five to eight with a great first experience in cricket. There will be eight one-hour sessions, held over eight weeks during summer. The activity and game based program is suitable for all skill levels, providing children with the foundations to begin a lifelong love of physical activity and cricket, while making friends in a safe and enjoyable environment.

References

External links 
 Slough Cricket Club
 Slough Play Cricket

English club cricket teams
Cricket in Berkshire
Sport in Slough